Baranzate, formerly a frazione of the neighboring comune of Bollate, is a comune (municipality) in the Metropolitan City of Milan, in the Italian region of Lombardy, about  northwest of Milan. It was created in 2004 after its previous establishment, in 2001, was declared unconstitutional.

Baranzate is bordered by Bollate to the north and northwest, Novate Milanese to the east, and Milan's Roserio district to the south and southwest.

History
Prior to 2001, Baranzate was a frazione of the comune of Bollate. It was established as a comune in its own right in November of that year by the promulgation of a regional law. In 2003 this law was declared unconstitutional by the Constitutional Court of Italy. The establishment of the new comune was annulled, and Barazate became once more a frazione of Bollate. In May 2004 a new regional law re-established the comune.

A ruling in the Court of Justice of the European Union in 2012 involving the comune of Baranzate declared that Italian legislation on local taxation constituted on unlawful restriction of freedom of establishment and freedom to provide services, which are among the fundamental freedoms of the European Union.

References

External links
 Official website

Cities and towns in Lombardy
Bollate